Gordon Elford "Gord" Dickson (2 January 1932 – 19 January 2015) was a Canadian long-distance runner. He competed in the marathon at the 1960 Summer Olympics. Dickson ran at both the 1958 and 1962 Commonwealth Games, placing 5th in 1958 and 12th in 1962 in the marathon. He won a bronze medal in the marathon at the 1959 Pan American Games.

References

1932 births
2015 deaths
Athletes (track and field) at the 1960 Summer Olympics
Canadian male long-distance runners
Canadian male marathon runners
Olympic track and field athletes of Canada
Athletes (track and field) at the 1959 Pan American Games
Pan American Games bronze medalists for Canada
Pan American Games medalists in athletics (track and field)
Athletes (track and field) at the 1958 British Empire and Commonwealth Games
Athletes (track and field) at the 1962 British Empire and Commonwealth Games
Commonwealth Games competitors for Canada
Athletes from Calgary
Medalists at the 1959 Pan American Games
21st-century Canadian people
20th-century Canadian people